Man Hunt is a 1936 American comedy film directed by William Clemens and written by Roy Chanslor. The film stars Ricardo Cortez, Marguerite Churchill, Charles "Chic" Sale, William Gargan, Dick Purcell and Olin Howland. The film was released by Warner Bros. on February 15, 1936.

Plot

Cast 
      
 Ricardo Cortez as Frank Kingman
 Marguerite Churchill as Jane Carpenter
 Charles "Chic" Sale as Ed Hoggins 
 William Gargan as Hank Dawson
 Dick Purcell as Skip McHenry 
 Olin Howland as Starrett
 Addison Richards as Mel Purdue
 George E. Stone as Silk
 Anita Kerry as Babe
 Nick Copeland as Blackie
 Russell Simpson as Jeff Parkington
 Eddie Shubert as Joe
 Kenneth Harlan as Jim Davis
 Don Barclay as Reporter Waffles
 Cy Kendall as Sheriff at Hackett
 Maude Eburne as Mrs. Hoggins
 Frederic Blanchard as Bill Taylor
 Larry Kent as Jim Bainter
 George Ernest as Jackie
 Milton Kibbee as Sam / Art 
 Billy Wayne as Dunk

References

External links 
 
 
 
 

1936 films
Warner Bros. films
American comedy films
1936 comedy films
Films directed by William Clemens
American black-and-white films
1930s English-language films
1930s American films
Films scored by Bernhard Kaun